Belle-Anse is an arrondissement in the Sud-Est department of Haiti. As of 2015, the population was 158,081 inhabitants. Postal codes in the Belle-Anse Arrondissement start with the number 93.

The arondissement consists of the following communes:
 Belle-Anse
 Anse-à-Pitres
 Grand-Gosier
 Thiotte

References

Arrondissements of Haiti
Sud-Est (department)